Jeanne Helbling (July 26, 1903 – August 6, 1985) was a French film actress.

Selected filmography

 The Thruster (1924)
 Mandrin (1924)
 Captain Rascasse (1927)
 Behind the Altar (1927)
 The Three-Sided Mirror (1927)
 Mascots (1929)
 The Hero of Every Girl's Dream (1929)
 Counter Investigation (1930)
 The Big Trail (1931)
 Durand Versus Durand (1931)
 Billeting Order (1932)
 Kiss Me (1932)
 Fifty Fathoms Deep  (1932)
 The Champion Cook (1932)
 Helene (1936)
 The Red Dancer (1937)
 Sarati the Terrible (1937)
 Three Waltzes (1938)
 Fire in the Straw (1939)
 The Last Metro (1945)
 Women's Games (1946)

References

Bibliography
 Goble, Alan. The Complete Index to Literary Sources in Film. Walter de Gruyter, 1999.

External links

1903 births
1985 deaths
French film actresses
French silent film actresses
20th-century French actresses
People from Thann, Haut-Rhin
French emigrants to the United States